European Spring (PE) was a Spanish electoral list in the European Parliament election in 2014 made up from several left-wing parties, including Coalició Compromís and Equo.

Composition

Electoral performance

European Parliament

Defunct political party alliances in Spain
Defunct socialist parties in Spain